David Britt may refer to:
 David M. Britt (1917–2009), North Carolina politician and jurist
 R. David Britt, American professor of chemistry